Rus is a village and municipality in the province of Jaén, Andalusia, in southern Spain.

References

Municipalities in the Province of Jaén (Spain)